Grosvenor is a locality in the North Burnett Region, Queensland, Australia.

Heritage listings 
Grosvenor has a number of heritage-listed sites, including:

 Grosvenor Cemetery Road: Grosvenor Flat Cemetery

References 

North Burnett Region
Localities in Queensland